Rest House is a 1969 Indian Malayalam film, directed by J. Sasikumar and produced by Ganesh Pictures K. P. Kottarakkara. The film stars Prem Nazir, Sheela, Sreelatha Namboothiri and Raghavan in the lead roles. The film had musical score by M. K. Arjunan.

Cast

Prem Nazir
Sheela
K. P. Ummer
Adoor Bhasi (Double Role)
Sreelatha Namboothiri
Raghavan
Friend Ramaswamy
Kunchan
Lakshmi
Meena
Paravoor Bharathan
Vincent
Sadhana
 Kottayam Chellappan
 Hamza
 Nabeesa
 Vijaya Kamalam
Hema

Soundtrack

References

External links
 

1969 films
1960s Malayalam-language films
Films directed by J. Sasikumar